Vila Vila (in Hispanicized spelling) or Wila Wila (Aymara) is the second municipal section of the Mizque Province in the Cochabamba Department, Bolivia. Its seat is Vila Vila.

Subdivision 
Vila Vila Municipality is divided into two cantons.

See also 
 Chullpa Q'asa
 Iskay Ch'utu
 Jatun Urqu
 Puka Qawiña
 Tikrasqa

References 

  Instituto Nacional de Estadistica de Bolivia  (INE)

External links 
 Population data and map of Vila Vila Municipality

Municipalities of the Cochabamba Department